Medúlla is the fifth studio album by Icelandic recording artist Björk. It was released on 30 August 2004 in the United Kingdom by One Little Indian Records and in the United States by Elektra Entertainment. After the release of her electronic-influenced previous album Vespertine (2001), Björk intended to make an album almost entirely a cappella constructed with human vocals, in opposition to the previous album's intense process of composition and multiple layers of instrumentation. The album's title derives from the Latin word for "marrow".

Medúlla received critical acclaim from music critics, with many calling it "unique", although others deemed it "confusing". The album was also commercially successful, reaching number one in Belgium's Wallonia, France and Iceland, whilst also peaking within the top ten in the United Kingdom. Medúlla is estimated to have sold more than a million copies worldwide, and received two nominations at the 47th Grammy Awards.

Two singles were released from Medúlla: "Who Is It" and "Triumph of a Heart", with both charting inside the top 40 in the United Kingdom and the top 10 in Spain. Björk further promoted the album by performing the song "Oceania" at the 2004 Summer Olympics opening ceremony, Friday Night with Jonathan Ross and other television and radio shows. Other than these few performances, no concerts or tours were arranged to promote Medúlla, as Björk thought it would be too difficult to play the songs live. In 2015, the album was adapted into an opera at the Brussels opera house La Monnaie by Sjaron Minailo and Anat Spiegel.

Background and production
Björk began working on her fifth studio album in 2002, being known as The Lake Album at the time. In an interview with The New Yorker, she explained that she wanted to get away from the world of instruments and electronics, which was present on her previous album, Vespertine (2001). She then elaborated that it was "very introverted" and avoided eye contact. When she was finishing Vespertine, Björk knew she wanted to make a vocal album, and had known since her teenage years that one day she would. For her, the majority of the album is connected to the time when she was 17 to 18 years old, focusing on aspects of life, love, family, and friends. She commented that she was thinking about how she used to live her life, how carefree she was, and how others around her affected the way she thought, saying it is shown clearly at the core of Medúlla.

Whilst working on initial ideas for the album, an eight-months pregnant Björk began adding her own live drumming to arrangements that already had several instruments. She then started muting the instruments, and liked the result of it. She was inspired by paganism, and the idea of returning to a universe that is entirely human, without tools or religion or nationalities. "I wanted the record to be like muscle, blood, flesh. We could be in a cave somewhere and one person would start singing, and another person would sing a beat and then the next person sing a melody, and you could just kind of be really happy in your cave. It's quite rootsy", she added.

Tanya Tagaq, an Inuit throat singer who worked with Björk on her 2001 Vespertine World Tour, was also featured. Björk was so impressed with her voice's ability that she invited Tagaq to work with her on the album. She asked British singer Robert Wyatt to be a featured vocalist on the album, as she was looking for something more "passionate" and "human". Additionally, the musician "wanted a bit of rock" on Medúlla, so she invited singer Mike Patton of rock band Faith No More. Björk also invited the London and Icelandic choirs, in order to have a classical feel on the album. However, the "musical fascist" in her decided using any MCs or vocal percussionists would be too "cheesy"; she later changed her mind when she saw beatboxer Rahzel from The Roots freestyle a whole Kraftwerk track without pausing for breath. Björk found his voice "above and beyond any cliché" and thought he was perfect for the album's beat-based songs. Another beatboxer, Dokaka, was invited after Björk got a link to his webpage and liked his covers so much that she decided to work with him; he appears on a few songs.

American R&B diva Beyoncé was planned to be featured on the album as well, but she did not appear due to scheduling issues. When asked what she liked about Beyoncé, Björk stated that "[Medúlla] is an album about voices, and she's got the most amazing voice."

Artwork and title

The album cover for Medúlla was photographed by Inez and Vinoodh in London, on 28 June 2004, and designed by M/M Paris. It features Björk wearing a mask made of hair, which was made specifically for the shoot, a black dress and a necklace that is made of black "bones" that says "Medúlla". The hair mask was created by Icelandic artist Shoplifter. The artist stated that in 2004, she had a show at ATM Gallery, where she displayed a wall mural made of brown braids. Björk appreciated it, and then invited her to work on creating a hair sculpture for the Medúllas character. She also explained that the singer wanted it to have a darkness about it, and then she sent Björk several references of extreme hairstyles, and because the album was made with voices, Björk wanted something that was part of the human body.

Photographer Inez van Lamsweerde said that they "were all inspired by women's handicrafts and this idea of being in your own cocoon in your home, with your family, and this reclusive character that hand-makes the whole world around her". The hairpiece was part of her 2015 MoMA retrospective. In an interview with Style magazine, Shoplifter said about her part at the exhibition, explaining it dedicated a room to each album of Björk's career, with the Medulla section having a mannequin wearing the hairmask and the dress designed by Alexander McQueen which she wore in the music video for "Who Is It".

The title was announced in June 2004 through Björk's official website. She had struggled to choose a suitable title while preparing the album. She said that something in her "wanted to leave out civilisation, to rewind to before it all happened and work out, 'Where is the human soul? What if we do without civilisation and religion and patriotism, without the stuff that has gone wrong?'" She provisionally called it Ink, a title that suggested to her the idea of "that black, 5,000-year-old blood that's inside us all; an ancient spirit that's passionate and dark and survives." Her friend Gabriela then suggested "medulla", a medical term for "marrow" in Latin. She noted that the word refers not only to bone marrow, but also to various other anatomical structures, including parts of the kidney and of hair; in this sense, she said the word represented "getting to the essence of something". The accent on the letter "ú" was intended to make the word cuter with a pun on the Icelandic word "dúlla": "We thought it was funny," she said, "then it became mysterious."

Composition

Style and influences

At the time of its construction, Björk considered Medúlla to be her most political album, saying that it countered outbreaks of racism and patriotism that followed the 11 September attacks. "On 9/11, in the space of a half an hour, this became the most patriotic place on earth", she recalled. "I remember describing to my friends on my phone that [if] I turned 180 degrees anywhere I was in New York. I would count at least 37 American flags. So it was kind of scary for a foreigner to be here". Regarding the album's composition, Björk also mentioned that she tried to find the common soul in everything, outside nationality and religion, whilst elaborating that she felt that "in that sense, it's a greatest hits of human spiritualism [laughs]. I think it's the first time I have done an album while I am reading the news. These are crazy times. It just seems that patriotism is a bad idea. I don't know how directly the album reflects that, but it is sort of anti-patriotic. Anti-Iceland as much as anti-anything".

Medúlla is almost entirely a cappella, also demonstrating avant-garde and experimental music. musicOMH's review stated that, "Despite its voice-only premise, Medúlla shows off a mile-wide scope of influences", noting elements of folk and medieval music, despite Björk previously stating that Medúlla was "folk music, but without any folk attached" to the album. She also considered the styles encompassing the album as "primitive and silly". Wondering Sound wrote that despite "its comparative starkness, [Medúlla is] every bit as sensual as [Vespertine]". The publication also added: "The electronic treatments range from industrial distortion to percussive glitches and dreamy layering, rarely descending into novelty". The album combines beatboxing, classical choirs that suggest composers like Penderecki or Arvo Pärt, and "mews, moans, counterpoint and guttural grunts" provided by herself and guests like Mike Patton, Robert Wyatt and Tanya Tagaq. Medúlla includes "vocal fantasias" that lean toward chamber music, alongside tracks that "are obviously but distantly connected to hip-hop." Glimpses of Bulgarian women's choirs, the polyphony of central African pygmies, and the "primal vocalisms" of Meredith Monk were also noted.

Songs
The album opens with "Pleasure Is All Mine", which begins with a vocal harmony set atop a woman's panting; it carries on a short while before Björk starts singing her verses, accompanied by a choir, which fills the background with cathedral-resonant harmonies. Björk sings "When in doubt: give" repeatedly, providing contrast to an "alarming" groove. "Show Me Forgiveness", an a cappella "short confessional anthem" follows, having no other effect than a slight echo applied to her voice. She sings: "Show me forgiveness / For having lost faith in myself / And let my own interior up / To inferior forces / The shame is endless". During the third song "Where Is the Line", she lyrically attacks a younger relative for being greedy and unreliable, displaying irritation: "I'm elastic for you, but enough is enough". "Demonic vocals" are delivered by singer Mike Patton, and "angelically dissonant swaths of lush singing" from the Icelandic Choir; as Rahzel beatboxes, the choir emotes some "ahhhs". The song grows darker as it builds up as the male members of the choir deliver heavier sounds. The "somber" song called "Vökuró", originally by Jórunn Viðar, is the fourth track on Medúlla. Björk rolls her tongue around certain words, and she is accompanied by a choir.
 
During the fifth track "Öll Birtan", Bjork's voice is layered over several times, with a drone like voice in the left channel, whilst doot-doos echo into the right channel. The following song and lead single "Who Is It" features collaborations by Inuit throat singer Tanya Tagaq and Rahzel. Some lyrics of the song—"Who is it that never lets you down?"—may be understood to reflect a "mother's unconditional love" in a dialogue between mother and child. The echo effects in "Who Is It" may additionally reflect the scattered sense of self the mother may experience as she carries the burden of constant care for her child. "Submarine", the seventh track on the album, was influenced by Björk's pregnancy with her daughter Ísadóra and how she felt somewhat lazy during that time. It has a "hint of political consciousness", and features the "reedy" voice of singer Robert Wyatt multiplied into a chorus to share lines like "Shake us out of the heavy deep sleep, do it now". The next track "Desired Constellation" was created from a sample of Björk singing the phrase "I'm not sure what to do with it" from "Hidden Place" on her previous album, Vespertine. She imagines herself "With a palm full of stars/ I throw them like dice on the table/ Until the desired constellation appears".

The ninth song, "Oceania", is about "Mother Oceania" from which Björk believes all life emerged, whilst she sings: "You have done well for yourselves / Since you left my wet embrace / And crawled ashore". "Oceania" also features The London Choir. Tenth song "Sonnets/Unrealities XI" was based on the poem "It May Not Always Be So; And I Say" by E. E. Cummings. Lyrically, she bids farewell to a lover. It features only Björk's singing, with slight inflections from the Icelandic Choir. The following track "Ancestors" has no lyrics, featuring only Björk and Tagaq's voices. The twelfth song "Mouth's Cradle" is paced by a "glug, glug" sample of "what might as well be the emptying of a gallon bottle of water". Lyrically, she concludes: "I need a shelter to build an altar away from Osamas and Bushes". On the thirteenth track of the album, "Miðvikudags", Björk sings once again in gibberish, while some doot-doos can be heard in the background, reminiscent of "Öll Birtan". On the closing track and second single, "Triumph of a Heart", the singer lyrically "celebrates the workings of anatomy", whilst musically it is the album's closest thing to a dance track. The song also features orchestral arrangements by the Icelandic and London Choirs, as well as hooks coming from a "human trombone", herself, Gregory Purnhagen, and Rahzel and Dokaka.

Release and promotion
On 3 August 2004, BBC Radio 1's The Breezeblock show premiered the tracks "Pleasure Is All Mine" and "Mouth's Cradle", whilst The New York Times newspaper has posted on their website short clips for four tracks "Mouth's Cradle", "Oceania", "Where Is the Line" and "Who Is It". Medúlla was first released on 30 August 2004 worldwide through Polydor Records, whilst it was distributed in the United Kingdom by One Little Indian. In the United States, the album was released the day after, by Elektra Records. Lead single "Who Is It" reached the top five in Spain, also peaking within the top 30 in Italy and the United Kingdom. Second single "Triumph of a Heart" peaked at the top ten in Spain, and reached the top 40 in Italy and the United Kingdom.

"Oceania" was commissioned by the International Olympic Committee and performed at the 2004 Summer Olympics opening ceremony. She wore a very large dress which unfolded during her performance to eventually occupy the entire stadium and showed a map of the world in sign of union. On 8 October 2004, Björk performed at the BBC Studios for the show Friday Night with Jonathan Ross. She performed a bell choir mix of "Who Is It" with Rahzel and an English bell choir. On 10 October 2004, Björk performed a set of five songs live in studio for Gilles Peterson's BBC Radio 1 program. On 15 October 2004, Björk performed a set of six songs for the French television show Album de la Semaine at Canal+ studios in Paris, France.

Other than these few performances, no concerts or tours were arranged to promote Medúlla. Björk said in an interview that "everybody involved seems to be up for it, so maybe they'll all come on the road. What I'd like to do is make another album like this and then tour for two of the at once". She also spoke to Rolling Stone in June 2004 and told that she wished to immediately continue writing and recording yet another new album: "Every album I've done, the minute that it's done, I feel really lubricated and, like, 'Wow, now I can write an album in five minutes'... And I just want to find out if that's just a fantasy or if it's true." Also, Björk thought it would be too difficult to play the songs live.

Critical reception

Medúlla received acclaim from music critics. The album holds a rating of 84 out of 100 at Metacritic. The Guardian newspaper's David Peschek gave it five stars out of five and heralded it as "brave and unique". Dominique Leone from Pitchfork commented that Medulla was "an interesting record", while saying Björk had "found a way to bathe her immediately distinctive melodies and vocal nuances in solutions that cause me to reevaluate her voice and her craft". Barry Walters of Rolling Stone stated that "Medulla is both the most extreme record Bjork has ever released and the most immediately accessible." Blenders Ann Powers was also positive, calling it "another playful step" in Björk's "unstoppable, wandering quest". Matthew Gasteier from Prefix magazine called Medúlla her most joyful album since Post and also her strangest at the time. Mark Daniell from Canadian website Jam! also gave it a positive review, saying "pairing gooey purrs with grooves provided by a human trombone might not seem like a good idea, but when Björk is the one making the arrangements the effect is spine tingling". Andy Battaglia of The A.V. Club said that "Once perceptions and expectations settle out... the album proves arrestingly in thrall to its own twisted tongue".

Heather Phares of AllMusic thought that Medúlla is "not an immediate album, but it is a fascinating one, especially for anyone interested in the world's oldest instrument being used in unexpected ways". Jennifer Vineyard from MTV News called the album "an ambitious project", but not because it was almost entirely a cappella. She said that some songs are "pretty unusual", as some could be medieval hymns, and others could be modern pop songs. E! Online commented that "Fans of the Icelandic wonder's more orchestral tunes might think there's something missing here. Well, unless they're too busy being totally blown away". David Hooper from BBC Music gave Medúlla a mixed review, stating that it has some high points and it never gets boring, but the album left him "feeling rather confused", because "the end product feels disjointed and at times claustrophobic", and that the excessive experimentation did not hit the mark. Björk received two Grammy Award nominations for Medúlla, including Best Female Pop Vocal Performance for "Oceania", and Best Alternative Music Album. This album was also featured in the book 1001 Albums You Must Hear Before You Die.

Commercial performance
In the United Kingdom, Medúlla debuted at its peak of number nine on the UK Albums Chart, for the issue dated 11 September 2004, and remained for three weeks on the chart. The album was certified Silver on 10 December 2004, by the British Phonographic Industry (BPI), for shipments of at least 60,000 copies in the region. In Austria, Medúlla debuted and peaked at number six, remaining on the albums chart for seven weeks. In France, it peaked at number one on the albums chart, during the week dated 29 August 2004, remaining on the top for another week. After spending 24 weeks on the chart, Medúlla was certified Gold by the Syndicat National de l'Édition Phonographique (SNEP). In Björk's native Iceland, the album debuted at the top of the chart, staying there for three weeks. It peaked at number two in Italy, spending nine weeks on the chart.

In the United States, Medúlla debuted at number 14 on the Billboard 200 albums chart, on the issue dated 18 September 2004. It became the highest-debuting album of her career, and remained for seven weeks inside the chart. Additionally, Medúlla also topped the Dance/Electronic Albums chart. As of May 2007 it has sold 235,000 copies in the region, according to Nielsen SoundScan. In Australia, Medúlla debuted at number 17 on the ARIA Charts, on the issue dated 12 September 2004. It spent three weeks on the chart, falling off at number 40. In New Zealand, the album peaked at number 35 and spent two weeks inside the New Zealand Albums Chart. As of May 2014, Medúlla has sold more than a million copies worldwide.

Track listing
All tracks produced by Björk, except "Where is the Line", "Submarine" and "Oceania", produced with Mark Bell.

Personnel
Credits adapted from Medúlla liner notes.

 Björk – lead vocals, arrangement, programming , choir arrangement, bass line , bass synth , piano 
 Tagaq – Inuit throat singing 
 Mike Patton – vocals 
 Robert Wyatt – vocals 
 Rahzel – beatboxing  
 Shlomo – beatboxing 
 Dokaka – beatboxing 
 Gregory Purnhagen – human trombone 
 The Icelandic Choir – choral vocals 
 The London Choir – choral vocals 
 Nico Muhly – piano 
 Mark Bell – bass synthesizer , programming 
 Peter Van Hooke – gong 
 Little Miss Spectra – programming  
 Matmos – programming 
 Olivier Alary – programming 
 Valgeir Sigurdsson – programming 
 Mark "Spike" Stent – mixing
 Nick Ingham – conductor (Olympic Studios choir session)
 Karl Olgeirsson – copyist (Iceland sessions)
 Nick Mera – copyist (London session)
 Sturla Thorisson – engineer (assistant, Greenhouse Studios)
 Christian Rutledge – engineer (assistant, Looking Glass)
 Rob Haggett – engineer (assistant, Olympic Studios)
 David Treahearn – engineer (assistant, Olympic Studios)
 Juan Garcia – engineer (assistant, The Magic Shop)
 Flavio de Souza – engineer (Ilha Dos Sapos Studios)
 Ichiho Nishiki – engineer (Looking Glass)
 Neil Dorfsman – additional recording
 Jake Davies – additional recording
 M/M Paris – art direction, design
 Shoplifter / Hrafnhildur Arnardóttir – artwork (hair sculpture)
 Andrea Helgadóttir – artwork (skin colours)
 Inez van Lamsweerde and Vinoodh Matadin – photography

Choir

The Icelandic Choir
 Anna Hinriksdóttir – alto vocals
 Arngerður María Árnadóttir – alto vocals
 Aðalheiður Þorsteinsdóttir – alto vocals
 Guðrún Edda Gunnarsdóttir – alto vocals
 Guðrún Finnbjarnardóttir – alto vocals
 Jónína Guðrún Kristinsdóttir – alto vocals
 Benedikt Ingólfsson – bass vocals
 Hafsteinn Þórólfsson – bass vocals
 Hjálmar Pétursson – bass vocals
 Örn Arnarson – bass vocals
 Þorvaldur Þorvaldsson – bass vocals
 Elfa Ingvadóttir – soprano vocals
 Hera Björk Þórhallsdóttir – soprano vocals
 Hugrún Hólmgeirsdóttir – soprano vocals
 Kristín Erna Blöndal – soprano vocals
 Björn Thorarensen – tenor vocals
 Guðmundur Vignir Karlsson – tenor vocals
 Gísli Magna – tenor vocals
 Þorbjörn Sigurðsson – tenor vocals

The London Choir
 Ann de Renais
 Emma Brain-Gabbot
 Heather Chirncross
 Helen Hampton, Helen Pakker
 Jacqueline Barron
 Janet Mooney
 Jenny O'Grady
 Judith Sim
 Karen Woodhowe
 Kim Chandler
 Melanie Marshall
 Micaela Haslam
 Nicki Kennedy
 Rachel Chapman
 Samantha Shaw
 Sarah Eyden
 Sarah Simmondi
 Tarsha Colt
 Yona Dunsford

Charts

Weekly charts

Year-end charts

Certifications and sales

Notes

References

External links
 Medúlla at bjork.com

2004 albums
Björk albums
A cappella albums
Albums produced by Björk
Albums produced by Mark Bell (British musician)
Albums recorded at Olympic Sound Studios
One Little Independent Records albums